Wade-Gery is a British surname. People with the name include:

Laura Wade-Gery (born 1965), British business executive
Sir Robert Wade-Gery (1929–2015), British diplomat
Theodore Wade-Gery (1888–1972), British classical scholar, historian and epigrapher

See also
Wade (surname)
Gery (disambiguation)

Compound surnames